Qezel Bolagh (also Romanized as Qezel Bolāgh) is a village in Siyah Mansur Rural District, in the Central District of Bijar County, Kurdistan Province, Iran. At the 2006 census, its population was 189, in 48 families. The village is populated by Kurds with a Azerbaijani minority.

References 

Towns and villages in Bijar County
Kurdish settlements in Kurdistan Province
Azerbaijani settlements in Kurdistan Province